Against the Grain is the second album from The Veer Union (and their first under their current name, since they had released their debut album under the name "Veer"). The album was released by Universal Motown on  April 21, 2009. Three singles were released from the album, "Seasons", "Youth of Yesterday", and "Darker Side of Me".

Track listing 
All songs written by Crispin Earl and Eric Schraeder, except where noted.
 "Seasons" – 3:47
 "Youth of Yesterday" (Crispin Earl, Brian Howes, and Eric Schraeder) – 2:54
 "Over Me" – 3:15
 "Darker Side of Me" – 2:45
 "I'm Sorry" (Earl, Howes, and Schraeder) – 3:51
 "Final Moment" – 3:32
 "Better Believe It" – 3:17
 "Into Your Garden" – 3:12
 "Your Love Kills Me" (Earl, Howes, and Schraeder) – 3:11
 "Breathing In" – 4:00
 "Where I Want to Be" – 2:40
 "What Have We Done" (Greg Archilla, Earl, and Schraeder) – 5:32

References 

2009 debut albums
The Veer Union albums
Universal Motown Records albums